Chalkwell Park is a recreational park in Chalkwell, Southend-on-Sea, in Essex, England.

The arts and music festival Village Green is held on the grounds of Chalkwell Park annually in the summer. The festival often receives more than 25,000 visitors each year.

History 
In 1830, Chalkwell Hall was built in the centre of the park. At the time, it didn't have a well-defined purpose. The park was formed from the land surrounding the hall. In 1901 or 1903, the Southend-on-Sea Borough Council purchased the land for £20,000.

A small garden of remembrance commemorating those who lost their lives during the Second World War was opened in the park on 30 April 1952.

In the 1950s or earlier, a small petting zoo was established in Chalkwell Hall containing at various points in time peacocks, monkeys and in the 1970s, a Himalayan black bear named Lulu. The last inhabitants were four peacocks in an enclosure which were eventually relocated to a private estate where there was more space. The hall also serves as a modern art house.

Chalkwell Hall was designated as a Grade II listed building in 1974.

Cricket ground 
The cricket ground was first used by the Essex County Cricket Club, 1st XI in 1934 for County Championship matches and in 1970 for List A matches. The ground has not been used by the club 1st XI since 1976.

The ground has hosted 69 first-class matches and 8 List A matches:

Game information 
{| class="wikitable"
|-
! Game Type
! No. of Games
|-
| County Championship Matches
| 65
|-
| limited-over county matches
| 8
|-
| Twenty20 matches
| 0
|}

Game statistics – first-class 
{| class="wikitable"
|-
! Category
! Information
|-
| Highest Team Score
| There have been no team scores exceeding 500 scored at this ground
|-
| Lowest Team Score
| Somerset (48 against Essex) in 1961
|-
| Best Batting Performance
| Tom Pearce (211 Runs for Essex against Leicestershire) in 1948
|-
| Best Bowling Performance
| Derek Underwood (9/37 for Kent against Essex) in 1966
|}

Game statistics – one-day matches 
{| class="wikitable"
|-
! Category
! Information
|-
| Highest Team Score
| Essex (232/5 in 40 overs against Leicestershire) in 1976
|-
| Lowest Team Score
| Middlesex (41 in 19.4 overs against Essex) in 1972
|-
| Best Batting Performance
| Bob Cooke (83 Runs for Essex against Northamptonshire) in 1974
|-
| Best Bowling Performance
| Allan Jones (6/34 for Somerset against Essex) in 1971
|}

Club cricket 
Chalkwell Park is home to Westcliff-on-Sea Cricket Club and Leigh-on-Sea Cricket Club. Westcliff-on-Sea have played there since 1907 and moved a pavilion to the ground in 1910. Leigh-on-Sea started out as Chalkwell Park Cricket Club and played their first match here in 1907 against South Benfleet. They built their first pavilion for the 1922 season and a later replacement tat forms the core of their current building opened at the start of the 1954 season.

References 

Cricket grounds in Essex
Buildings and structures in Southend-on-Sea